Aubrey Dollar is an American actress. She is known for playing Marina Cooper on the CBS daytime soap opera Guiding Light from 2001 to 2004. Dollar has also starred in the short-lived television series Point Pleasant (2005–2006), Women's Murder Club (2007–2008), Battle Creek (2015), and Filthy Rich (2020).

Life and career
Aubrey Dollar was born in Raleigh, North Carolina, and studied at Needham B. Broughton High School, where she was a classmate of fellow actor Colin Fickes. She attended Boston University and Amherst College. Her younger sister, Caroline, is also an actress.

From 2001 to 2004, Dollar played Marina Cooper in the soap opera, Guiding Light. She is known for her roles as Judy Kramer in Point Pleasant, a 2005 series on Fox, and as Marcy Bender in Dawson's Creek. From 2007 to 2008, Dollar starred as Cindy Thomas on the ABC television series Women's Murder Club. She starred in the 2012 NBC pilot Happy Valley which was not picked up. She guest starred in Ugly Betty, The Good Wife, Person of Interest, and Weeds. Dollar appeared in a recurring role on the ABC supernatural drama series, 666 Park Avenue in 2012. 

Dollar was a cast member of the 2015 CBS series Battle Creek, which was cancelled after one season.

She was starred in a stage play called The Cake written by This is Us writer and producer Bekah Brunstetter in 2018.

Filmography

Film

Television

References

External links
 

Actresses from North Carolina
American child actresses
American film actresses
American soap opera actresses
American television actresses
Amherst College alumni
Boston University alumni
Living people
Actors from Raleigh, North Carolina
20th-century American actresses
21st-century American actresses
Needham B. Broughton High School alumni
Year of birth missing (living people)